Olympic sports are contested in the Summer Olympic Games and Winter Olympic Games. The 2020 Summer Olympics included 33 sports; the 2022 Winter Olympics included seven sports. Each Olympic sport is represented by an international governing body, namely an International Federation (IF).

The International Olympic Committee (IOC) establishes a hierarchy of sports, disciplines, and events. According to this hierarchy, each Olympic sport can be subdivided into multiple disciplines, which are often mistaken as distinct sports. Examples include swimming and water polo, which in the Olympic scheme are disciplines of the sport of "Aquatics" (represented by World Aquatics), and figure skating and speed skating, which are each disciplines of the sport of "ice skating" (represented by the International Skating Union). In turn, disciplines are subdivided into events, for which Olympic medals are awarded. The number and types of events may change slightly from one Olympiad to another.

Previous Olympic Games included sports that are no longer included in the current program, such as polo and tug of war. Known as "discontinued sports", these have been removed due to either a lack of interest or the absence of an appropriate governing body for the sport. Some sports that were competed at the early Games and later dropped by the IOC, have managed to return to the Olympic program, for example archery, which made a comeback in 1972, and tennis, which was reintroduced in 1988. The Olympics have often included one or more demonstration sports, normally to promote a local sport from the host country or to gauge interest in an entirely new sport. Some such sports, like baseball and curling, were added to the official Olympic program (in 1992 and 1998, respectively). Baseball was discontinued after the 2008 Olympics in Beijing, only to be revived again for the 2020 Olympics in Tokyo, which saw the introduction of new disciplines within a number of existing Summer Olympic sports as well as several new sports, such as karate and skateboarding, making their Olympic debuts. Breakdancing will make its debut at the 2024 Summer Olympics in Paris and Ski Mountaineering will debut at the 2026 Winter Olympics.

Olympic sports definitions

The term "sport" in Olympic terminology refers to all events sanctioned by an international sport federation, a definition that may differ from the common meaning of the word "sport". One sport, by Olympic definition, may comprise several disciplines, which would often be regarded as separate sports in common usage.

For example, aquatics is a summer Olympic sport that includes six disciplines: swimming, artistic swimming, diving, water polo, open water swimming, and high diving (the last of which is a non-Olympic discipline), since all these disciplines are governed at international level by the International Swimming Federation. Skating is a winter Olympic sport represented by the International Skating Union, and includes four disciplines: figure skating, speed skating (on a traditional long track), short track speed skating, and synchronized skating (the latter is a non-Olympic discipline). The sport with the largest number of Olympic disciplines is skiing, with six: alpine skiing, cross-country skiing, ski jumping, Nordic combined, snowboarding, and freestyle skiing.

Other notable multi-discipline sports are gymnastics (artistic, rhythmic, and trampoline), cycling (road, track, mountain, and BMX), volleyball (indoors and beach), wrestling (freestyle and Greco-Roman), canoeing (flatwater and slalom), and bobsleigh (includes skeleton). The disciplines listed here are only those contested in the Olympics—gymnastics has two non-Olympic disciplines, while cycling and wrestling have three each.

The IOC definition of a "discipline" may differ from that used by an international federation. For example, the IOC considers artistic gymnastics a single discipline, but the International Federation of Gymnastics (FIG) classifies men's and women's artistic gymnastics as separate disciplines. Similarly, the IOC considers freestyle wrestling to be a single discipline, but United World Wrestling uses "freestyle wrestling" strictly for the men's version, classifying women's freestyle wrestling as the separate discipline of "female wrestling".

On some occasions, notably in the case of snowboarding, the IOC agreed to add a sport that previously had a separate international federation to the Olympics on condition that they dissolve their governing body and instead affiliate with an existing Olympic sport federation, therefore not increasing the number of Olympic sports.

An event, by IOC definition, is a competition that leads to the award of medals. Therefore, the sport of aquatics includes a total of 46 Olympic events, of which 32 are in the discipline of swimming, eight in diving, and two each in artistic swimming, water polo, and open water swimming. The number of events per sport ranges from a minimum of two (until 2008, there were sports with only one event) to a maximum of 47 in athletics, which despite its large number of events and its diversity is not divided into disciplines except on an informal basis - the division between, for example, swimming and diving in aquatics is not replicated within athletics by divisions between track and field events, or stadium and road events.

Criteria for inclusion and thresholds 
In the past there have been numeric criteria about widely practiced sports, disciplines or events. Nowadays such criteria have been abolished.

The sports that are eligible for inclusion in the programme, beside the current Olympic International Federations, are only those “governed by other IFs recognised by the IOC”,  as per the Bye-law to Rule 45 of the Olympic Charter (§1.3.2). If this criterion is met, then the opportunity to propose additional sports to the programme is at the full discretion of the respective Organising Committee of the Olympic Games and subject to the final decision of the IOC Session.

However, there are indicative thresholds which restrict the addition of new sports, disciplines and events. According to Bye-law 3.2 to Rule 45 of the Olympic Charter, in the edition of 2021: "Unless agreed otherwise with the relevant OCOG [Organising Committee for the Olympic Games], the following approximate numbers shall apply:

– with respect to the Games of the Olympiad, ten thousand five hundred (10,500) athletes, five thousand (5,000) accredited coaches and athletes’ support personnel and three hundred and ten (310) events.

– with respect to the Olympic Winter Games, two thousand nine hundred (2,900) athletes, two thousand (2,000) accredited coaches and athletes’ support personnel and one hundred (100) events."

However, such thresholds have already been surpassed.

Changes in Olympic sports

The list of Olympic sports has changed considerably during the course of Olympic history, and has gradually increased over time.

The only summer sports that have never been absent from the Olympic program are athletics, aquatics (the discipline of swimming has been in every Olympics), cycling, fencing, and gymnastics (the discipline of artistic gymnastics has been in every Olympics).

The only winter sports that were included in all Winter Olympic Games are skiing (only nordic skiing), skating (figure skating and speed skating), and ice hockey. Figure skating and ice hockey were also included in the Summer Olympics before the Winter Olympics were introduced in 1924.

For most of the 20th century, demonstration sports were included in many Olympic Games, usually to promote a non-Olympic sport popular in the host country, or to gauge interest and support for the sport.
The competitions and ceremonies in these sports were identical to official Olympic sports, except that the medals were not counted in the official record.
Some demonstration sports, like baseball and curling, were later added to the official Olympic program.
This changed when the International Olympic Committee decided in 1989 to eliminate demonstration sports from Olympic Games after 1992. An exception was made in 2008, when the Beijing Organizing Committee received permission to organize a wushu tournament.

Women are still barred from Greco-Roman wrestling and Nordic combined, but on the other hand, there are women-only disciplines, such as rhythmic gymnastics and artistic swimming.

In previous years, sports that depend primarily on mechanical propulsion, such as motor sports, could not be considered for recognition as Olympic sports, though there were power-boating events in the early days of the Olympics before this rule was enacted by the IOC. Part of the story of the founding of aviation sports' international governing body, the FAI, originated from an IOC meeting in Brussels, Belgium on 10 June 1905.The relevant strict clause excluding motorsports, stating that "Sports, disciplines or events in which performance depends essentially on mechanical propulsion are not accepted" has been removed from the Olympic Charter. FIA and FAI are included in the International Federations recognised by the International Olympic Committee, and therefore in theory could be eligible.

Previous Olympic Games included sports which are no longer present on the current program, like polo and tug of war. In the early days of the modern Olympics, the organizers were able to decide which sports or disciplines were included on the program, until the IOC took control of the program in 1924. As a result, a number of sports were on the Olympic program for relatively brief periods before 1924. These sports, known as discontinued sports, were removed because of lack of interest or absence of an appropriate governing body, or because they became fully professional at the time that the Olympic Games were strictly for amateurs, as in the case of tennis.
Several discontinued sports, such as archery and tennis, were later readmitted to the Olympic program (in 1972 and 1984, respectively). Curling, which was an official sport in 1924 and then discontinued, was reinstated as Olympic sport in 1998.

The Olympic Charter decrees that Olympic sports for each edition of the Olympic Games should be decided at an IOC Session no later than seven years prior to the Games.

Changes since 2000
The only sports that have been dropped from the Olympics since 1936 are baseball and softball, which were both voted out by the IOC Session in Singapore on 11 July 2005, a decision that was reaffirmed on 9 February 2006, and reversed on 3 August 2016. These sports were last included in 2008, although officially they remain recognized in the Olympic Charter as a single sport, since both are now governed internationally by the World Baseball Softball Confederation. Therefore, the number of sports in the 2012 Summer Olympics was dropped from 28 to 26.

Following the addition of women's boxing in 2012, and women's ski jumping in 2014, there are only Greco-Roman wrestling and nordic combined, respectively, that are only for men in those games.

Two previously discontinued sports, golf and rugby, returned for the 2016 Summer Olympics. On 13 August 2009, the IOC Executive Board proposed that golf and rugby sevens be added to the Olympic program for the 2016 Games. On 9 October 2009, during the 121st IOC Session in Copenhagen, the IOC voted to admit both sports as official Olympic sports and to include them in the 2016 Summer Olympics. The IOC voted 81–8 in favor of including rugby sevens and 63–27 in favor of reinstating golf, thus bringing the number of sports back to 28.

In February 2013, the IOC considered dropping a sport from the 2020 Summer Olympics to make way for a new sport. Modern pentathlon and taekwondo were thought to be vulnerable, but instead the IOC recommended dismissing wrestling. On 8 September 2013, the IOC added wrestling to the 2020 and 2024 Summer Games.

On 3 August 2016, the IOC voted to add baseball/softball, karate, sport climbing, surfing, and skateboarding for the 2020 Summer Olympics. On 21 February 2019, the Paris Organising Committee announced they would propose the inclusion of breakdancing (breaking), as well as skateboarding, sport climbing, and surfing—three sports which debuted at the then-upcoming 2020 Summer Olympics as optional sports. All four sports were approved during the 134th IOC Session in Lausanne, Switzerland on 24 June 2019.

On 18 June 2021, the International Olympic Committee issued a proposal for a new winter sport, ski mountaineering, for the 2026 Winter Olympics. The proposal was approved during the IOC's session in Tokyo on 20 July.

Summer Olympics

At the first Olympic Games, nine sports were contested. Since then, the number of sports contested at the Summer Olympic Games has gradually risen to twenty-eight on the program for 2000–2008. At the 2012 Summer Olympics, however, the number of sports fell back to twenty-six following an IOC decision in 2005 to remove baseball and softball from the Olympic program. These sports retain their status as Olympic sports with the possibility of a return to the Olympic program in future games. At the 121st IOC Session in Copenhagen on 9 October 2009, the IOC voted to reinstate both golf and rugby to the Olympic program, meaning that the number of sports to be contested in 2016 was once again 28.

In order for a sport or discipline to be considered for inclusion in the list of Summer Olympic sports, it must be widely practiced in at least 75 countries, spread over four continents.

Current and discontinued summer program
The following sports (or disciplines of a sport) make up the current and discontinued Summer Olympic Games official program and are listed alphabetically according to the name used by the IOC. The discontinued sports were previously part of the Summer Olympic Games program as official sports, but are no longer on the current program. The figures in each cell indicate the number of events for each sport contested at the respective Games; a bullet denotes that the sport was contested as a demonstration sport.

Eight of the 32 sports at the 2024 Summer Olympics consist of multiple disciplines. Each discipline is marked with a unique 3-character identifier code. Disciplines from the same sport are grouped under the same color:

 Aquatics –
 Basketball –
 Canoeing/Kayaking –
 Cycling –
 Gymnastics –
 Volleyball –
 Equestrian –
 Wrestling –
 Baseball and Softball –
 Karate

 Unofficial IOC Discipline code used to disambiguate sports

Demonstration summer sports

The following sports or disciplines have been demonstrated at the Summer Olympic Games for the years shown, but have never been included on the official Olympic program. Organizers of the 1900 and 1904 Olympic Games, which were staged in conjunction with world's fairs, included numerous sporting events on an equal footing under their programmes. Historians generally regard many of these as not satisfying retrospective inclusion criteria to qualify as "official." However, the IOC has never made a determination regarding which events were official and which were not. Designation of official demonstration sports began with the 1912 Olympic Games.

  American football (1932)
  Australian football (1956)
  Tenpin Bowling (1988)
    Budō (1964)
  Pesäpallo (1952)
  Gaelic football (1904)
  Glima (1912)
  Gliding (1936)
  Hurling (1904)
  Kaatsen (1928)
  Korfball (1920 and 1928)
  La canne (1924)
  Roller hockey (1992)
  Savate (1924)
  Swedish (Ling) gymnastics (1948)
  Weight training with dumbbells (1904)
  Water skiing (1972)

Like all the 1900 Olympic events widely regarded today as official, there were other events conducted during the 1900 World's Fair.

  Angling
  Ballooning (hydrogen-filled, non-fueled)
  Boules
 Cannon shooting
 Fire fighting
 Kite flying
  Surf lifesaving
  Longue paume
  Motor racing
  Motorcycle racing
 Pigeon racing
  Water motorsports

Gliding was promoted from demonstration sport to an official Olympic sport in 1936 in time for the 1940 Summer Olympics, but the Games were cancelled due to the outbreak of World War II.

Tenpin bowling, demonstrated separately from the Olympics in 1936 in Germany (alongside forms of ninepin bowling), but part of the demonstration sports at Seoul in 1988, has been a regular medal sport of the World Games since 1981 and the Pan American Games since 1991.

Classification of Olympic sports for revenue share

Summer Olympic sports are divided into categories based on popularity, gauged by: television viewers (40%), internet popularity (20%), public surveys (15%), ticket requests (10%), press coverage (10%), and number of national federations (5%). The category determines the share the sport's International Federation receives of Olympic revenue.

The current categories, as of 2013, are as follows, with the pre-2013 categorizations also being available. Category A represents the most popular sports; category E lists either the sports that are the least popular or that are new to the Olympics (golf and rugby).

Winter Olympics

Before 1924, ice sports like figure skating and ice hockey were held at the Summer Olympic Games. These two sports made their debuts at the 1908 and the 1920 Summer Olympics respectively, but in 1924 they were moved to the first edition of the Winter Olympic Games and became permanent fixtures on the sports program for the Winter Olympics from then on.

The International Winter Sports Week, later dubbed the I Olympic Winter Games and retroactively recognized as such by the IOC, consisted of nine sports. The number of sports contested at the Winter Olympics has since been decreased to seven, comprising a total of fifteen disciplines.

A sport or discipline must be widely practised in at least 25 countries, and on three different continents, to be eligible for inclusion on the Olympic program for the Winter Games.

Current winter program

The following sports (or disciplines of a sport) make up the current Winter Olympic Games official program and are listed alphabetically, according to the name used by the IOC. The figures in each cell indicate the number of events for each sport that were contested at the respective Games (the red cells indicate that those sports were held at the Summer Games); a bullet denotes that the sport was contested as a demonstration sport. On some occasions, both official medal events and demonstration events were contested in the same sport at the same Games.

Three out of the eight sports consist of multiple disciplines. Disciplines from the same sport are grouped under the same color:

 Bobsleigh –
 Skating –
 Skiing

Demonstration winter sports

The following sports have been demonstrated at the Winter Olympic Games for the years shown, but have never been included on the official Olympic program:

  Bandy (1952)
  Disabled skiing (1984 and 1988)
  Ice stock sport (1936, 1964)
  Ski ballet (acroski) (1988 and 1992)
  Skijoring (1928)
  Sled-dog racing (1932)
  Speed skiing (1992)
  Winter pentathlon (1948)

Ice climbing was showcased at the Sochi Winter Olympics in 2014, was on the non-competition program at the 2016 Winter Youth Olympic Games, and aims to become an official competition sport. Ski ballet was a demonstration event under the scope of freestyle skiing. Disabled sports are now part of the Winter Paralympic Games.

Recognized international federations

Many sports are not contested at the Olympics although their governing bodies are recognized by the IOC. Such sports, if eligible under the terms of the Olympic Charter, may apply for inclusion in the program of future Games, through a recommendation by the IOC Olympic Programme Commission, followed by a decision of the IOC Executive Board and a vote of the IOC Session. When Olympic demonstration sports were allowed, a sport usually appeared as such before being officially admitted. An International Sport Federation (IF) is responsible for ensuring that the sport's activities follow the Olympic Charter. When a sport is recognized by the IOC, the IF becomes an official Olympic sport federation and can assemble with other Olympic IFs in the Association of Summer Olympic International Federations (ASOIF, for summer sports contested in the Olympic Games), Association of International Olympic Winter Sports Federations (AIOWS, for winter sports contested in the Olympic Games), or Association of IOC Recognised International Sports Federations (ARISF, for sports not contested in the Olympic Games). A number of recognized sports are included in the program of the World Games, a multi-sport event run by the International World Games Association, an organization that operates under the patronage of the IOC. Since the start of the World Games in 1981, a number of sports, including badminton, taekwondo, and triathlon have subsequently been incorporated into the Olympic program.

In 2020, the IOC altered the way it plans the Olympic sports program: rather than basing it on a maximum number of sports, the total number of events are now taken into account, opening the schedule up for the inclusion on a per-Games basis of additional sports to the 25 "core" sports. For the 2020 Summer Olympics, the local organizing committee was thus permitted to add five sports to the program in addition to the existing 28, taking the total to 33. Baseball and softball have been treated by the IOC as a single sport since the governing bodies for baseball and softball merged into a single international federation in 2013 (with male athletes competing in baseball and female athletes competing in softball). 

The governing bodies of the following sports, though not contested in the Olympic Games, are recognized by the IOC:

  Air sports1,3
  American football (provisional)
  Auto racing3
  Bandy
  Baseball2,5
  Billiard sports1
  Boules1
  Bowling1
  Bridge
  Cheerleading (provisional)
  Chess
  Cricket2
  Floorball1
  Flying disc1
  Ice stock sport
  Karate1,2
  Kickboxing (provisional)1
  Korfball1
  Lacrosse1
  Lifesaving1
  Motorcycle racing3
  Mountaineering and climbing
  Muaythai1
  Netball
  Orienteering1
  Pelota vasca
  Polo2
  Powerboating3
  Racquetball1
  Roller sports1,4
  Sambo
  Softball2,5
  Squash1
  Sumo1
  Tug of war1,2
  Underwater sports1  
  Water skiing1,3,6
  Wakeboarding1,3,6
  Wushu

1 Official sport at the World Games
2 Discontinued Olympic sport
3 The Olympic Charter no longer forbids motorized sports from being included in the Olympic program, but environmental impact is now considered when deciding whether to adopt new sports making the inclusion of motorized sports unlikely. 
4 Skateboarding, a discipline within roller sports, was included at the 2020 Summer Olympics. Inline and roller skating has never been contested. 
5 Baseball and softball share the same governing body.
6 Waterski and wakeboard share the same governing body. Cable waterskiing and cable wakeboarding have been proposed as sports that do not rely on motorboats.

See also
Association of Summer Olympic International Federations
Association of International Olympic Winter Sports Federations
Association of IOC Recognised International Sports Federations

Notes

References

External links

International Olympic Committee - Sports
IOC Olympic Programme Commission
International Sports Federations

 
Sports
Sports at multi-sport events by competition